Rumana Ahmed (born 29 May 1991) is a Bangladeshi cricketer who plays for the Bangladesh cricket team. She plays as a right-handed batter and right-arm leg break bowler.

Early life and background
Ahmed was born on 29 May 1991 in Khulna, Bangladesh.

Career
Ahmed made her ODI debut against Ireland on 26 November 2011. She took her ODI best bowling figures on 12 April 2013, taking 4/20 against India. In 2016, Ahmed became the first Bangladeshi women to take an international hat-trick, doing so in an ODI against Ireland.

Ahmed made her T20I debut against Ireland on 28 August 2012. In June 2018, she was part of Bangladesh's squad that won their first ever Women's Asia Cup title, winning the 2018 Women's Twenty20 Asia Cup tournament. Later the same month, she was named in Bangladesh's squad for the 2018 ICC Women's World Twenty20 Qualifier tournament. She was the leading wicket-taker for Bangladesh in the tournament, with ten dismissals in five matches.

In October 2018, she was named in Bangladesh's squad for the 2018 ICC Women's World Twenty20 tournament in the West Indies. Ahead of the tournament, she was named as the star of the team and one of the players to watch. In January 2020, she was named as the vice-captain of Bangladesh's squad for the 2020 ICC Women's T20 World Cup in Australia.

In November 2021, she was named in Bangladesh's team for the 2021 Women's Cricket World Cup Qualifier tournament in Zimbabwe. In January 2022, she was named in Bangladesh's team for the 2022 Commonwealth Games Cricket Qualifier tournament in Malaysia. Later the same month, she was named in Bangladesh's team for the 2022 Women's Cricket World Cup in New Zealand.

Other cricket
Ahmed was a member of the team that won a silver medal in cricket against the China national women's cricket team at the 2010 Asian Games in Guangzhou, China. Rumana performed well in both bat and ball.

In October 2019, she was named in the Women's Global Development Squad, ahead of a five-match series in Australia.

References

External links

 
 

1991 births
Living people
People from Khulna
Bangladeshi women cricketers
Bangladeshi women cricket captains
Bangladesh women One Day International cricketers
Bangladesh women Twenty20 International cricketers
Khulna Division women cricketers
Eastern Zone women cricketers
Women's One Day International cricket hat-trick takers
Cricketers at the 2010 Asian Games
Cricketers at the 2014 Asian Games
Medalists at the 2010 Asian Games
Medalists at the 2014 Asian Games
Asian Games medalists in cricket
Asian Games silver medalists for Bangladesh